Timothy Whitehead (born 10 January 1997) is a South African cricketer. He made his first-class debut on 13 February 2020, for Boland in the 2019–20 CSA 3-Day Provincial Cup.

References

External links
 

1997 births
Living people
South African cricketers
Boland cricketers
Place of birth missing (living people)